Final results for the Handball competition at the 1992 Summer Olympics:

Medal summary

References

External links
 International Olympic Committee medal database

 
Hand
1992
Oly
1992